This is a list of countries by silver production in 2018 based on data by the United States Geological Survey (USGS).

Countries

See also
 List of silver mines

References

Lists of countries by mineral production
Silver